New York's 12th State Senate district is one of 63 districts in the New York State Senate. It has  been represented by Democrat Michael Gianaris, the Deputy Senate Majority Leader, since 2011.

Geography
District 12 is located primarily in Northwest Queens, covering the neighborhoods of Astoria, Long Island City, and Sunnyside, as well as parts of Woodside, Maspeth, Ridgewood and Woodhaven.

The district overlaps with New York's 6th, 7th, 8th, 12th, and 14th congressional districts, and with the 23rd, 30th, 34th, 36th, 37th, 38th, and 39th districts of the New York State Assembly.

Recent election results

2020

2018

2016

2014

2012

Federal results in District 12

References

12